Bronisław Hager (1890–1969) was a Polish activist and public health pioneer.

References

1890 births
1969 deaths
Polish public health doctors
20th-century Polish physicians